The 72nd annual Berlin International Film Festival, usually called the Berlinale, took place from 10 to 20 February 2022 in person. On 15 December 2021 the first film of the festival was announced. The festival opened with François Ozon's drama film Peter von Kant. Isabelle Huppert was awarded Honorary Golden Bear for lifetime achievement on 15 February 2022 at the Berlinale Palast award ceremony. Her film by Laurent Larivière, À propos de Joan was also screened.

The awards were presented on 16 February 2022 truncating the festival by 4 days. Alcarràs by Carla Simón won the Golden Bear award and The Novelist's Film by Hong Sang-soo won the Silver Bear Grand Jury Prize. The festival formally closed on 20 February 2022.

Jury

Competition

The following were on the jury for the Berlinale Competition section:

 M. Night Shyamalan, director, screenwriter and producer (USA) - Jury President
 Karim Aïnouz, director, screenwriter and visual artist (Brazil)
 Saïd Ben Saïd, producer (France / Tunisia)
 Anne Zohra Berrached, film director and screenwriter (Germany)
 Tsitsi Dangarembga, novelist, playwright and filmmaker (Zimbabwe)
 Ryusuke Hamaguchi, director and screenwriter (Japan)
 Connie Nielsen, actress (Denmark)

Encounters

The following people were on the jury for the Encounters Awards:

 Chiara Marañón
 Ben Rivers
 Silvan Zürcher

FIPRESCI Jury

The following people were on the jury for the FIPRESCI Awards:

 Lamia Fathy
 Ron Fogel
 Berke Göl
 Bettina Hirsch
 Pamela Jahn
 Anders E. Larsson
 René Marx
 Anna Maria Pasetti
 Hamed Soleimanzadeh
 Andrei Vasilenko
 Hsin Wang
 Alexander Zwart

Competition
The following films are selected for the main competition for the Golden Bear and Silver Bear awards:
Highlighted title indicates award winner.

Berlinale Special

Encounters
The following films are selected for the Encounters section:
Highlighted title indicates award winner.

Panorama
The following films are selected for the Panorama section:

Perspektive Deutsches Kino
The following films are selected for the Perspektive Deutsches Kino section:

Forum
The following films are selected for the Forum section:

Generation

Long films
The following films are chosen for the Generation section:

Short films

Generation Kplus

Generation 14plus

The Homage films
This section in 72nd edition is dedicated to French film and stage actor Isabelle Huppert, who will also be awarded an Honorary Golden Bear for lifetime achievement.

The Retrospective
This section opened on 11 February 2022, with screening in 4K of the 1936 film My Man Godfrey by Gregory La Cava.

The Classic
The restored silent 1929 classic film  Brüder (Brothers) by Werner Hochbaum, screened on 13 February 2022.

Awards

Competition
 Golden Bear: Alcarràs by Carla Simón
 Silver Bear Grand Jury Prize: The Novelist's Film by Hong Sang-soo
 Silver Bear Jury Prize: Robe of Gems by Natalia López Gallardo
 Silver Bear for Best Director: Claire Denis for Both Sides of the Blade
 Silver Bear for Best Leading Performance: Meltem Kaptan for Rabiye Kurnaz vs. George W. Bush
 Silver Bear for Best Supporting Performance: Laura Basuki	for Before, Now & Then
 Silver Bear for Best Screenplay: Laila Stieler for Rabiye Kurnaz vs. George W. Bush
 Silver Bear for Outstanding Artistic Contribution: Rithy Panh and Sarit Mang for Everything Will Be Ok
 Special Mention: A Piece of Sky by Michael Koch

 Encounters
 Best Film: Mutzenbacher by Ruth Beckermann
 Best Director: Cyril Schäublin for Unrest
 Special Jury Award: See You Friday, Robinson by Mitra Farahani

International Short Film
 Golden Bear for Best Short Film: Trap by Anastasia Veber
 Silver Bear Jury Prize: Sunday Morning by Bruno Ribiero
 Berlin Short Film Candidate for the European Film Awards: The Sower of Stars by Lois Patiño
 Special Mention: Bird in the Peninsula by Atsushi Wada
Generation
Youth Jury Awards
 Crystal Bear for the Best Film: Alis by Clare Weiskopf
 Special Mention: Stay Awake by Jamie Sisley
 Crystal Bear for the Best Short Film: Born in Damascus by Laura Wadha
 Special Mention: Nothing to See Here by Nicolas Bouchez

Generation 14plus
 Grand Prix: Kind Hearts by Olivia Rochette
 Ex aequo et bono: Scheme by Farkhat Sharipov
 Special Prize for the Best Short Film: Goodbye Jérôme! by Adam Sillard, Gabrielle Selnet, Chloé Farr
 Special Mention: Blue Noise by Simon Maria Kubiena and Tinashé by Tig Terera
Generation Kplus
Children’s Jury awards
 Crystal Bear for the Best Film: Comedy Queen by Sanna Lenken
 Special Mention: The Quiet Girl by Colm Bairéad
 Crystal Bear for the Best Short Film: Spotless by Emma Branderhorst and Luce and the Rock by Britt Raes
International Jury
 Grand Prix for the Best Film: The Quiet Girl by Colm Bairéad
 Special Mention: Shabu by Shamira Raphaëla
 Special Prize for the Best Short Film: Gavazn by Hadi Babaeifar
 Special Mention: To Vancouver by Artemis Anastasiadou

Other awards

 Honorary Golden Bear: Isabelle Huppert
 GWFF Best First Feature Award: Sonne by Kurdwin Ayub

 Berlinale Documentary Award: Myanmar Diaries by The Myanmar Film Collective
 Special Mention: No U-Turn by Ike Nnaebue

 FIPRESCI Critics Award: Leonora Addio by Paolo Taviani

Panorama Audience Award Winner - Feature Film 2022: 
1st Place Baqyt (Happiness) by Askar Uzabayev
2nd Place: Klondike by Maryna Er Gorbach
3rd Place: Fogaréu by Flávia Neves

Panorama Audience Award Winner - Panorama Dokumente 2022:
1st Place: Aşk, Mark ve Ölüm (Love, Deutschmarks and Death) by Cem Kaya
2nd Place: Nel mio nome (Into My Name) by Nicolò Bassetti
3rd Place: Myanmar Diaries by The Myanmar Film Collective

Teddy Award

 Best Feature Film: Three Tidy Tigers Tied a Tie Tighter by Gustavo Vinagre
 Best Documentary Film: Ali's by Clare Weiskopf and Nicolás van Hemelryck
 Jury Award: Nelly & Nadine by Magnus Gertten
 Best Short Film: Exalted Mars by Jean-Sébastien Chauvin

References

External links
 
 72nd Berlin International Film Festival at IMDb

72
2022 film festivals
2022 festivals in Europe
2022 in German cinema